The Godman-Salvin Medal is a medal of the British Ornithologists' Union awarded "to an individual as a signal honour for distinguished ornithological work." It was instituted in 1919 in the memory of Frederick DuCane Godman and Osbert Salvin.

Medallists 
Medallists include:

See also

 List of ornithology awards

References

British Ornithologists' Union
Ornithology awards
Awards established in 1922
British awards